"Let's Go Round Again" was a single released by the Scottish funk and R&B group Average White Band. The single achieved in the charts UK No. 12, US Pop No. 53, US R&B No. 33, US Disco No. 24
The corrected title "Let's Go 'Round Again" can be seen in their printed 1994 compilation album Pickin' Up the Pieces: The Best of Average White Band 1974-1980.

1994 version
In 1994, the Average White Band decided to remix it after signing with The Hit Label. This version made No. 56 on the UK Singles Chart.

Louise version

English singer Louise covered "Let's Go Round Again" in November 1997 for her second album, Woman in Me (1997). It is one of her most successful singles, charting at number eight in Scotland, number ten in the UK, number 21 in Belgium and number 30 in France. On the Eurochart Hot 100, the single reached number 30 in December 1997.

Critical reception
Jon O'Brien from AllMusic viewed the song as "a faithful cover". Pan-European magazine Music & Media commented, "As her former Eternal colleagues move further into R&B, Louise has been just as effectively repositioned as a mainstream pop/dance act. Here, the process continues with a skilful rebuild of the 1980 Average White Band hit which becomes a slick and effective disco stomper with strong '70s overtones." A reviewer from Music Week gave her version three out of five, declaring it as "a catchy cover", "which is likely to gain momentum from her mammoth tour later this autumn. But it sadly lacks adventure." Gerald Martinez from New Sunday Times described it as "retro-disco".

Track listings
 UK CD 1 single
"Let's Go Round Again"
"Just When I Thought"
"How You Make Me Feel"

 UK CD 2 single
"Let's Go Round Again" (Radio Mix)
"Let's Go Round Again" (Colour Systems Inc. Amber Vocals Mix)
"Let's Go Round Again" (Paul Gotel's Peaceful Warrior Mix)
"Let's Go Round Again" (187 Lockdown Vocal Mix)
"Let's Go Round Again" (Rated PG Club Mix)

Charts

Weekly charts

Year-end charts

Other version(s)
In 1990 UK pop group Yell! released their version of "Let's Go Round Again". It charted at No. 78 on the UK Singles Chart.

References

1980 singles
Dance-pop songs
Disco songs
1997 singles
Louise Redknapp songs
1980 songs
RCA Records singles
EMI Records singles
Song recordings produced by David Foster
Average White Band songs